The Jamestown Jimmies  were a minor league baseball team based in Jamestown, North Dakota. Earlier Jamestown teams played as members of the Class D level Dakota League in 1922 and North Dakota League in 1923, with the Jimmies playing as members of the Northern League in 1936 and 1937. The 1936 Jamestown Jimmies were a St. Louis Cardinals minor league affiliate and won the league pennant. The Jimmies hosted minor league home games at City Park, after the "Jimkotans" and "Jimkotas" played at McElroy Park, in the same location.

History 
Minor league baseball began in Jamestown, North Dakota in 1922.  The 1922 Jamestown Jimkotans became members of the eight–team Class D level Dakota League, replacing the Huron Packers franchise in the league. H.E. Ross established the Jamestown Jinkotas. The Jamestown newspaper held a naming contest and "Jimkotans" beat out "Fort Sewards" by five votes. Funds were raised for a grandstand for the ballpark.

The Jamestown Jimkotans ended their first season of minor league play with a record of 46–51,placing 5th in the Dakota League standings. Wib Smith was the Jamestown manager, as the Jimkotans finished 14.0 games behind the 1st place Mitchell Kernels in the final standings. Mark Koenig played for Jamestown in 1922 at age 17, hitting .253. His manager, Wib Smith had made the major leagues at the age of 17 with the St. Louis Browns and was important to Koenig's development. Koenig would eventually become a member of the New York Yankees' famed 1927 Murderers' Row lineup, where he hit 2nd in the Yankees' lineup, directly in front of Babe Ruth.

The franchise continued play in 1923, joining a new league. To minimize travel, the Dakota League was divided into the South Dakota League and the North Dakota League in 1923 and each played with four teams, with the North Dakota League maintaining Class D Status. The Jamestown Jimkotas played as members of the 1923 North Dakota League, with Logan Powell of Jamestown serving as the North Dakota League president. The Jimkotas ended the season with a record of 32–35, placing 2nd, finishing 15.0 games behind the 1st place Minot Magicians. Ed Whiting and Henry Wingfield served as managers, as Wingfield hit .402 to lead the North Dakota League in batting average. The North Dakota League permanently folded after the 1923 season ended prematurely in August.

In the 1930s, integrated semi–pro baseball thrived in the area and the integrated Jamestown Red Sox team played against other regional teams, with such names as Satchel Paige playing for the local teams.

In 1936, minor league baseball returned as the Jamestown Jimmies became members of the Class D level Northern League, playing as a minor league affiliate of the St. Louis Cardinals. The "Jimmies" moniker originated in Jamestown as the moniker for the local University of Jamestown athletic teams beginning in 1925. The 1936 Jimmies won the Northern League pennant. The team ended the 1936 season with a record of 73–50, placing 1st in the Northern League regular season under managers John Anderson, Ernie Olson and Rube Foster, finishing 4.0 games ahead of the 2nd place Eau Claire Bears. In the 1936 Northern League playoffs, the Winnipeg Maroons defeated the Jimmies in seven games.

In their final season of minor league play, the 1937 Jamestown Jimmies placed 5th in the Northern League final standings. With a record of 49–65, Jamestown finished behind the 1st place Duluth Dukes, who also had become the league's St. Louis Cardinals affiliate. Edward Kraus served as Jamestown manager in 1937. The Jamestown franchise folded from the Northern League after the completion of the 1937 season.

Jamestown, North Dakota has not hosted another minor league team.

The ballpark
Jamestown hosted minor league home games in McElroy Park, which contains Jack Brown Stadium, in 1922 and 1923. The McElroy Park ballpark was built in 1917 and was later renamed. Today, Jack Brown Stadium is home to University of Jamestown and Jamestown High School teams. The address is 1102 3rd Avenue SE, Jamestown, North Dakota.

In 1936 and 1937, the Jamestown Jimmies played home games at City Park. City Park and McElroy Park are the same location.

Timeline

Year–by–year records

Notable alumni

Mark Koenig (1922)
Dave Odom (1936)
Wib Smith (1922, MGR)
Ed Whiting (1923, MGR)

References

External links
Baseball Reference

Professional baseball teams in North Dakota
Defunct baseball teams in North Dakota
St. Louis Cardinals minor league affiliates
Northern League (1902-71) baseball teams
Jamestown, North Dakota
Baseball teams established in 1936
Baseball teams disestablished in 1937